Jocelyn Bartram (born 4 May 1993) is an Australian field hockey player. She plays as a goalkeeper for the Australian women's national field hockey team.

Early life and education
Jocelyn Bartram is from Albury–Wodonga ("The Border"), Australia. Bartram was an active child, playing field hockey, soccer, water polo, basketball and tennis during her youth. Her mother, father and brother also played hockey. Bartram commenced her studies focusing on Sports Science through Sydney's University of Technology. More recently she has transferred her sports science studies to Edith Cowen University in Perth, in conjunction with her move to Perth for her permanent placement in the Hockeyroos squad.

Career
Bartram spent two years on the Under-21 team for Australian women's field hockey. She was then cut from the team in the lead up to the 2013 Under-21 field hockey world cup. Bartram has played goalkeeper for the NSW team in the Australian Hockey League since 2008. In 2014, national selectors noticed her performance in the Australian Hockey League and named Bartram to the national development squad, allowing Bartram to train with the national team.

Bartram made her debut playing for Australia's women's national field hockey team in March 2016. Beyond playing with the national team, Bartram also plays for the Suburban Lions. Bartram was also part of the team for the 2017 Oceania Cup. Since then she has toured with the Hockeyroos for the 2017 world league, 2018 world cup and 2019 Pro league, accumulating over 40 international caps.

In 2022 she was the goalkeeper of the winning NSW Pride team in the 2022 Women's HockeyOne grand final. She defended a shootout to win the premiership.

References

External links
 
 
 

1993 births
Living people
Australian female field hockey players
Female field hockey goalkeepers
Commonwealth Games medallists in field hockey
Commonwealth Games silver medallists for Australia
Sportspeople from Albury
Field hockey players at the 2018 Commonwealth Games
Field hockey players at the 2022 Commonwealth Games
Sportswomen from New South Wales
20th-century Australian women
21st-century Australian women
Medallists at the 2018 Commonwealth Games
Medallists at the 2022 Commonwealth Games